is a Japanese musician, composer, and actor.

His group, the Down Town Boogie-Woogie Band, was one of the most prominent 1970s Japanese rock music bands. He also composed many of Momoe Yamaguchi's songs with Yoko Aki.

He is married to lyricist and actress Yoko Aki.

Discography

Down Town Boogie-Woogie Band

Composer

Acting roles

References

External links
  

1946 births
Japanese composers
Japanese male actors
Japanese male composers
Japanese rock musicians
Living people
Musicians from Kyoto Prefecture
People from Kyoto Prefecture